Walking with Dinosaurs is a 1999 six-part nature documentary television miniseries created by Tim Haines and produced by the BBC Science Unit the Discovery Channel and BBC Worldwide, in association with TV Asahi, ProSieben and France 3. Envisioned as the first "Natural History of Dinosaurs", Walking with Dinosaurs depicts dinosaurs and other Mesozoic animals as living animals in the style of a traditional nature documentary. The series first aired on the BBC in the United Kingdom in 1999 with narration by Kenneth Branagh. The series was subsequently aired in North America on the Discovery Channel in 2000, with Avery Brooks replacing Branagh.

Walking with Dinosaurs recreated extinct species through the combined use of computer-generated imagery and animatronics that were incorporated with live action footage shot at various locations, the techniques being inspired by the film Jurassic Park (1993). At a cost of £6.1 million ($9.9 million), Walking with Dinosaurs cost over £37,654 ($61,112) per minute to produce, making it the most expensive documentary series per minute ever made. The visual effects of the series were initially believed to be far too expensive to produce, but innovative techniques by the award-winning graphics company Framestore made it possible to bring down costs sufficiently to produce the three-hour series.

Sometimes referred to as the biggest science documentary series ever made, Walking with Dinosaurs was broadcast to record audiences. With 15 million people viewing the first airing of the first episode, the series remains by far the most watched science programme in British television history. Walking with Dinosaurs was released to critical acclaim and won numerous awards, including among others two BAFTA Awards, three Emmy Awards and a Peabody Award. Most scientists applauded Walking with Dinosaurs for its use of scientific research and for its portrayal of dinosaurs as animals and not movie monsters. Some scientific criticism was leveled at the narration not making clear what was speculation and what was not, and a handful of specific scientific errors.

The success of Walking with Dinosaurs spawned an entirely new genre of documentaries that similarly recreated past life with computer graphics and were made in the style of traditional nature documentaries. It also led to the creation of an entire media franchise of similar sequel documentary series, the Walking with... franchise, which included Walking with Beasts (2001), Walking with Cavemen (2003), Sea Monsters (2003) and Walking with Monsters (2005). The series was accompanied by companion books and an innovative companion website. Additionally, Walking with Dinosaurs inspired the creation of exhibitions, the live theatrical show Walking with Dinosaurs − The Arena Spectacular, video games, and a 2013 film adaptation. Along with Jurassic Park, Walking with Dinosaurs is often cited as among the most influential media depictions of dinosaurs.

Premise 
Envisioned as the first "Natural History of Dinosaurs" and a series that would provide viewers with "a window into a lost world", Walking with Dinosaurs explores life in the Mesozoic era, particularly dinosaurs, in the format of a traditional nature documentary.

Production

Background and concept 
Walking with Dinosaurs was the brainchild of Tim Haines, who came with the idea in 1996 while he was working as a science television producer at the BBC. Then-head of BBC Science Jana Bennett had at the time started a policy of encouraging producers to pitch possible future landmark series, with the goal of increasing the science output of the BBC and raising the bar of science programming. Bennett had mainly asked for suggestions for series on geology, medicine and natural history. The idea for Walking with Dinosaurs was devised in the aftermath of the release of the film Jurassic Park in 1993, which had set a new benchmark for dinosaur entertainment. Initially, Haines idea revolved around a history of palaeontology with some reconstructions but this was deemed to not be ambitious enough, shortly thereafter he devised the idea of a dinosaur series made with the look and feel of a natural history programme.

Haines suggested that the same techniques employed in the production of Jurassic Park could be used to create a series of nature documentary programmes. According to Haines, the aim of Walking with Dinosaurs was to "create an immersive experience that was both spectacular and informative". Haines investigated the costs that would be involved in the project. He first initially approached Industrial Light & Magic (ILM), the company responsible for creating the visual effects in Jurassic Park, which projected a cost of $10,000 per second of dinosaur footage, far too expensive for a television series. Though Jurassic Park had only nine minutes of dinosaur footage, the series envisioned by Haines would require three hours. As a result, Haines initially changed his idea to the programme mainly consisting of footage of plants, insects and landscapes with dinosaurs appearing only occasionally.

The concept for the series changed back to frequent CGI creatures after Haines spoke with the UK-based graphics company Framestore. Framestore had previously won Emmy Awards for their work on films such as Alice in Wonderland (1999) and miniseries such as Gulliver's Travels (1996). The head of Framestore, Mike Milne, at first turned down the project owing to its projected cost but later accepted since he realised that he would later regret it if another company took it up. Milne understood the concept of the programme and was able to bring down the cost of the animation considerably through flexibility and imagination. With Milne's assurance that making the programme would be possible, Haines pitched the idea to Bennett as a 6-episode series of 30-minute episodes and he called it Walking with Dinosaurs, at this time only intended to be a working title and deriving from Haines misremembering the title of the 1990 film Dances with Wolves.

Pilot episode and funding 

The BBC liked the concept of Walking with Dinosaurs but were nervous whether a series of its scale was actually achievable. After also pitching the idea to BBC Worldwide, Haines was granted £100,000 to produce a short pilot episode. In the spring of 1997, Haines, accompanied by a single cameraman, travelled to a national park near Paphos in Cyprus to shoot footage for the pilot. Milne then gathered a small team to produce models and animations. The resulting proof-of-concept pilot, finished by the summer of 1997, was six minutes long. The only consultant so far brought in for the project was the palaeontologist David Martill, who offered his services on the pilot for free if he could then stay on as a consultant should the pilot succeed and a series be made.

The pilot episode was marine-themed, revolving around a beached giant pliosaur, and based on the fossils of the Jurassic Oxford Clay in England (a setting later used for the episode Cruel Sea), a setting suggested by Martill. After concerns that the marine episode might not have enough "superstar" animals, Martill suggested the inclusion of the theropod dinosaur Eustreptospondylus. One of the major differences between the pilot and the later series was that it included partial x-rays of the inner workings of the animals so that they could be better explained. In the later series this was abandoned in favour of a more standard "natural history" aesthetic. In addition to the pilot, Framestore also produced stills and a shorter trailer with a group of plesiosaurs hunting fish to sell the idea of Walking with Dinosaurs.

There was already considerable interest in the series by the time the pilot was shown owing to the trailer and stills produced by Framestore. Jana Bennett also championed the idea of the series to both Michael Jackson, controller of BBC One, and Mike Quattrone of the Discovery Channel. The pilot was then enough to persuade the BBC, BBC Worldwide, and the Discovery Channel to fund the production of Walking with Dinosaurs. Approximately third of the Walking with Dinosaurs budget came from BBC One, a third from the Discovery Channel, and a third from BBC Worldwide. There were also major investments from TV Asahi in Japan and ProSieben in Germany.

Walking with Dinosaurs was considered a high-risk production due to being highly expensive and using "Hollywood technology" to educate rather than just entertain. In total, Walking with Dinosaurs cost £6.1 million ($9.9 million) to make. It cost over £37,654 ($61,112) per minute to produce, making it the most expensive documentary series per minute ever made. It was during production billed as one of the most ambitious series ever produced. Together with Haines, the series was also created by the acclaimed programme maker Susan Spindler, who had previously worked on the BBC series The Human Body. The team grew to encompass producer Jasper James (who also directed the sixth episode; Haines directed the rest), production manager Alison Woolnough and executive producer John Lynch.

Pre-production and filming 

Haines spent two years speaking with scientists and reading both primary and secondary palaeontological sources to create the stories for Walking with Dinosaurs. Though the goal was to make the programme feel as if it was just relaying natural events without intervention, as actual nature documentaries, Walking with Dinosaurs required Haines to plot out narratives and create storyboards.

Production of Walking with Dinosaurs took 18 months. It was essential to the vision of Walking with Dinosaurs that the age of the dinosaurs be represented as accurately as possible based on current scientific understanding. In addition to Haines's own research, the production team for the first six months devoted all their time to research and carefully chose particular moments during the Mesozoic that were most well-studied and well-understood by scientists and which would be representative of the era and showcase interesting animals. In addition to the producers doing their own research, over a hundred experts were consulted for every aspect of the series.

Slowly, the production team focused in on animals about whom sufficient information was known to create larger narratives. As an example, Coelophysis was selected for New Blood (the first episode) because it was a typical early dinosaur which scientists knew a lot about. Since the series also aimed to showcase the environment and other animals around the "star" dinosaurs, Coelophysis also presented an opportunity since it had been found at Ghost Ranch, New Mexico, one of the world's richest fossil beds. The behaviour of the animals depicted was primarily based on fossil evidence when possible (such as bite marks and fossil gut contents) and on behaviours in modern animals. Sometimes, behaviour was just reasoned guesses. For instance, the small pterosaur Anurognathus is shown in Time of the Titans (the second episode) to use the massive sauropod Diplodocus as a feeding platform to hunt insects. This was based on certain modern birds; there is no evidence of such behaviour in pterosaurs and it would be difficult to prove with fossil evidence.

In the summer of 1997 and in the winter of 1998, Haines and fellow producer Jasper James took a small crew of eight people to travel around the world to places where ancient plant life reminiscent of plants during the Mesozoic still existed; locations that could be used as backdrops for the series. Of particular importance was an absence of grass, which at the time was believed to not have existed during the Mesozoic. Filming took several weeks and locations included the Labyrinth in Tasmania, the beech gap on South Island in New Zealand, the redwood forests of California, the araucaria forests in New Caledonia and southern Chile and the Bahamas. Shooting at a single location usually lasted for about four weeks. New Caledonia was particularly difficult to shoot in since the French Army were doing exercises there simultaneously and the film crew kept bumping into soldiers and tanks.

Special effects

Computer graphics 

Mike Milne and Framestore, consisting of fifteen designers, began working on animating the dinosaurs at the same time as Haines and James were shooting footage for the series. Production of several hours of high quality photoreal animation had never been done before, not even for feature films. The process of making the computer models began with creating clay maquettes, highly detailed small-scale physical models. Several palaeontologists were consulted during the process of making the maquettes. In addition to David Martill, the consultants of Walking with Dinosaurs included, among others, Kent Stevens, Thomas R. Holtz, David Norman, David Unwin, Ken Carpenter, Jo Wright and Michael J. Benton. At times, details changed during production. For instance, the sauropod necks of Walking with Dinosaurs were at first fully erect before being altered on the advice of the sauropod neck expert Kent Stevens. In September 1998, Milne held a talk at the 46th Symposium on Vertebrate Palaeontology and Comparative Anatomy (SVPCA) at the University of Bournemouth, showcasing early renderings from the pilot and the series and gathering feedback from the palaeontologists in attendance.

After the maquettes were completed, Framestore scanned them into their computers using both a high resolution laser and a set of software tools developed together with Soho-CyberScan specifically for Walking with Dinosaurs. The models were then imported into Softimage 3D, where they could be digitally manipulated and animated. The animations were made by hand one frame at a time, an extremely time-consuming process, since it quickly became evident that any other method would have resulted in unconvincing animation. Since no one had ever seen a moving non-avian dinosaur, the animators based their animations on both footage of living animals, particularly elephants, and on information provided by palaeontologists. Palaeontologists provided information on the dynamics of dinosaur muscles, tendons and joints. In numerous cases, the animals in Walking with Dinosaurs had never before been animated with this level of scientific rigour. Many movements, such as the movement of pterosaurs on the ground, were educated guesses made based on scientific advice.

The textures for the models were created through a process of science-based guessing, deriving from the inferred life behaviour of the animals, their diet and their size (larger animals in real life tend to have duller colors). The digital artist Daren Horley was responsible for creating the textures and patterns of the animals and was during production sent actual fossil examples of dinosaur skin impressions. Despite the fossils available, Horley found that there had to in some cases be some informed compromise between strict accuracy and what looked best on screen; the scales of some species were too small to be visible on television screens.

The CGI shots were rendered by FrameStore using eight twin-processor NT boxes, at times augmented with the SGI workstations (single R10K processors) of the animators. The computer effects for the first episode took around a year to make, though the process could be significantly sped up afterwards; the five other episodes together took only six months. Initially, Framestore produced 24 different computer-generated animals, but as the concept of the series grew they had made 40 different species by the end of production. Compositing (adding the CGI together with the live footage) was done using five Quantel Henrys and five Discreet Logic Infernos.

Animatronics 

Though most of the animal shots in Walking with Dinosaurs are CGI, the series also made extensive use of animatronics and puppets. Haines explained in behind-the-scenes material that animatronics, despite advances in CGI, still played an important role, particularly in close-up shots; "The computer can fool the eye making a dinosaur run through a puddle and splashing but if you want a close-up of him dipping his nose into water and moving it back and forth, a computer-generated nose wouldn't look right."

The animatronics and puppets of Walking with Dinosaurs were made by the special effects company Crawley Creatures. Over 80 animatronic models were made for the series, mostly for close-ups of heads or other body parts. In some cases full body versions were made, mostly for corpses but also for some animals, such as Ophthalmosaurus. The greatest challenge for the artist at Crawley Creatures was working against time, since they only had six weeks between location shoots to put together animatronics and puppets for the next episode. The most challenging animal to model was the large pterosaur Ornithocheirus, which had to be able to work in different positions for the purposes of the series and had to be extremely light-weight for purposes of transportation.

After filming, several of the models used in Walking with Dinosaurs, including those of Ophthalmosaurus, Ornithocheirus and Koolasuchus, were given to David Martill and then used by him for educational purposes at the University of Portsmouth. The Ophthalmosaurus model, having been dragged through water, had to be repaired and repainted and is today displayed for the public; the Ornithocheirus and Koolasuchus models were later sold. Numerous models also made their way to the Oxford University Museum of Natural History due to an association between Crawley Creatures and the museum.

Music 
Ben Bartlett composed the score for Walking with Dinosaurs. Bartlett was then working with the BBC, having produced some station ident themes for BBC Radio 3. Bartlett was encouraged to accept the duties of composing the series' music at the behest of Haines and James. Bartlett wrote different leitmotifs in separate styles for each episode, citing the different themes and settings presented in each episode as inspiration, elaborating, "I tried to create a different sound world for each episode of Walking With Dinosaurs. That was easy, as they all had different moods. The first episode is all about heat and bloodlust, parched deserts and so on, while the second one was pastoral, peaceful, and beautiful, about dinosaurs living in symbiosis with the forests. And so on." The process of creating the score was that Bartlett would first watch the unscored episodes together with the directors, discussing with them possible music, and then write the music and produce a sample for approval. At times, this was difficult since the production of the computer graphics fell behind and some scenes were not finished in time for the recording sessions.

The recording process took place at Angel Recording Studios in Islington, with four sessions scattered over the early months of 1999. The score was recorded by the BBC Concert Orchestra. During these sessions, Bartlett admitted to being enriched with experience by the task, stating, "It was the biggest orchestral endeavour I've ever undertaken, and I learnt so much from the first session. Practical things, like handing out the parts to the players before the session, numbering pages... tiny logistical things that can really screw up a session." The BBC were early on impressed with the soundtrack and requested Bartlett and the orchestra to also produce tracks for a CD of the soundtrack.

Episodes

Walking with Dinosaurs (1999) 
BBC One aired the series weekly on Monday nights, with a regular repeats the following Sunday. In 2010, the series was repeated on BBC Three in omnibus format, as three hour-long episodes.

Specials (2000–2003) 
Three special episodes of Walking with Dinosaurs have been produced since the end of the original series. The first special was The Ballad of Big Al (2000), which closely followed the format of the original series but mostly focused on a single individual animal, an Allosaurus specimen nicknamed "Big Al". In response to complaints from scientists that many details in the original series seemed speculative, The Ballad of Big Al explained virtually every decision in detail and how it was based on fossil evidence. The two succeeding specials, The Giant Claw (2002) and Land of Giants (2003), starred wildlife presenter Nigel Marven as a "time-travelling zoologist", traveling back in time and interacting with various dinosaurs and other prehistoric animals.

Reception 
Walking with Dinosaurs was broadcast to record audiences and is sometimes considered the biggest science documentary series ever created. With 15 million viewers viewing the first episode on 4 October 1999 and another 3.91 million viewing it on its repeat the Sunday afterwards, Walking with Dinosaurs is by far the most watched science programme in British television history. By late 2000, 200 million people worldwide had seen the Walking with Dinosaurs. By 2005 the number had increased to almost 400 million and by 2009 it was around 700 million; unprecedented numbers for a palaeontology programme. In the BFI TV 100, a list compiled by the British Film Institute in 2000 of the greatest British TV programmes of all time and of any genre, Walking with Dinosaurs was placed 72nd.

Reviews 
Walking with Dinosaurs was released to critical acclaim. Most scientists applauded Walking with Dinosaurs for its use of scientific research and for its portrayal of dinosaurs as animals and not movie monsters. Some reviews were dismissives and contemptuous. Walking with Dinosaurs was praised in The Guardian, The Observer, The Independent and in The Independent on Sunday. Negative reviews were mostly founded on the series in some cases appearing to present speculation as fact. Nancy Banks-Smith in her review of Walking with Dinosaurs also worried that the success of the series would lead to the BBC exploiting its appeal to younger viewers and launching merchandise, writing that "I begin to think that the whole thing is geared to selling chocolate dinosaur eggs to five-year-olds".

Online reviewers were largely positive. Common Sense Media praised the program, giving it five stars out of five and saying that, "Somebody had a great idea, which was to make a documentary series about dinosaurs, but with a twist. The ageing Ornithocheirus on a desperate final flight to his mating grounds, the sauropod hatchlings struggling for survival in the late Jurassic, the migrating herds and the undersea life of 150 million years ago would all seem as real as a nature program about polar bears or snow monkeys." Walking with Dinosaurs was also praised by IGN, which referred to it as a fascinating documentary with excellent narratives, video quality and audio quality. The score of Walking with Dinosaurs was praised in the music technology magazine Sound on Sound as "extraordinary", "strikingly cinematic" and "head and shoulders above previous efforts in the same genre".

Awards

In other media

Books 
A companion book, Walking with Dinosaurs: A Natural History, was written by Tim Haines to accompany the first screening of the series in 1999. The settings of some of the six episodes were changed between the time the book was written and the screening of the television series, and some of their names were changed: New Blood is set at Ghost Ranch, and Cruel Sea is set at or near Solnhofen in Germany near what then were the Vindelicisch Islands. The book elaborated on the background for each story, went further in explaining the science on which much of the program is based, and included descriptions of several animals not identified or featured in the series. A Natural History received a positive review in the book review magazine Publishers Weekly, where it was called "magnificent" and "marvelously illustrated".

A companion volume to the first book, Walking with Dinosaurs: The Evidence, by David Martill and Darren Naish was published in 2000. It went into more detail about the research and suppositions that went into making the series. Michael J. Benton also wrote an accompanying book on the science of the series, titled Walking with Dinosaurs: The Facts. In addition to these larger volumes, there were also numerous children's books released to accompany Walking with Dinosaurs, including 3D albums, sticker albums, photo journals as well as shorter science books geared towards children.

Exhibition 
The success of Walking with Dinosaurs resulted in the creation of both exhibits and traveling exhibitions. Only a few months after the series had aired, Walking with Dinosaurs: The Exhibition was put up in the summer of 2000 at the Yorkshire Museum in York, England. The exhibition featured an assortment of different animal exhibits, each having some connection to the series, including props, maquettes, newly made models and actual fossil material. Among the fossils on display was a skeleton of a Plateosaurus. Also included in the exhibition were a video and TV monitor playing The Making Of Walking with Dinosaurs. The opening of the exhibition was attended by consultants of the series, such as David Martill. The guest of honour was Prince Philip, Duke of Edinburgh.

Live theatrical show 

In 2007, Walking with Dinosaurs was adapted as the live stage show Walking with Dinosaurs − The Arena Spectacular by the Australian-based company The Creature Technology Company. The production cost $20 million to stage and used puppetry, suits, and animatronics to create 16 Mesozoic era creatures representing 10 species. Each large dinosaur weighed several tons, and was operated by two "voodoo puppeteers" and a driver beneath the dinosaur who also monitors the hydraulics and batteries. The smaller dinosaurs were suits operated by the person in it, each weighing from 20–30 kg (44–66 lbs). After debuting in Sydney in 2007, The Arena Spectacular toured the world for twelve years; over 250 cities were visited and almost 10 million people in total watched the show live. The final show was held at the Taipei Arena in Taiwan on 22 December 2019.

Film adaptation 

Released in 2013, Walking with Dinosaurs is a feature-length film about dinosaurs in the Late Cretaceous period  years ago. The production features computer-animated dinosaurs in live-action settings with actors Justin Long, John Leguizamo, Tiya Sircar, and Skyler Stone providing voiceovers for the main characters. It was directed by Neil Nightingale and Barry Cook from a screenplay by John Collee.

The film was produced by BBC Earth and Evergreen Films and was named after the original BBC miniseries. The crew filmed footage on location in the U.S. state of Alaska and in New Zealand, which were chosen for their similarities to the dinosaurs' surroundings millions of years ago, and on locations in Humboldt County, California. Animal Logic designed computer-animated dinosaurs and added them to the live-action backdrop. Though the film was originally going to have a narrator like in the miniseries, Fox executives wanted to add voiceovers to connect audiences to the characters.

Walking with Dinosaurs premiered on  2013 at the Dubai International Film Festival. It was released in cinemas in 2D and 3D on  2013. Critical reception was largely negative, with praise towards film's visual effects but criticism for its story and voice acting. The Hollywood Reporter said the film's global box office performance was disappointing in context of the production budget and marketing spend.

In 2014, the film was rereleased in theatres and museums under the title Walking with Dinosaurs: Prehistoric Planet 3D. This version shortens the running time to 45 minutes and replaces the voiceovers with narration provided by Benedict Cumberbatch. Compared to its predecessor, this version received mixed-to-positive reviews from critics.

Video games 
Dinosaur World is a freeware video game developed by Asylum Entertainment and published by the BBC Imagineering in June 2001. It is a spin-off of Episode 2 of Walking with Dinosaurs ("Time of the Titans") and the special The Ballad of Big Al. The main point of the game is to find all the animals and plants, including several location features, that are distributed in five different zones.  The game was available on the BBC website as an alpha, as it was never fully developed.

In 2013, an augmented reality video game, titled simply Walking with Dinosaurs, was developed by Supermassive Games in collaboration with the BBC, as part of the resurgence of Walking with Dinosaurs, accompanying the release of the 2013 film adaptation. It was released in Europe on 13 November 2013, and in North America on 12 November 2013, alongside Diggs Nightcrawler and Book of Potions.

Website 
To accompany Walking with Dinosaurs, the BBC launched a website filled with both palaeontological information, behind-the-scenes information on the series, games and puzzles, glossaries, and a section where visitors could ask questions and make comments. The creation of a companion website, which went online in September 1999, was considered innovative for the time. Before the release of the series, the website included a trailer, still a new concept for a website in 1999. The website was updated weekly as new episodes were released, eventually becoming a large resource with educational material.

Legacy and influence

Scientific response 
Scientists largely applauded Walking with Dinosaurs, some going so far as heralding it as the "most credibly accurate depiction of dinosaur life ever produced." Despite some complaints of scientific inaccuracies, the series was seen, and continues to be remembered, as mostly a "force for good", showing both the possibility of producing documentaries of its scale and for portraying dinosaurs and other Mesozoic animals as animals and not movie monsters. Michael J. Benton, who worked as a consultant on the series, praised Walking with Dinosaurs as a progression in both reconstructions of prehistoric life and in the promotion of the public understanding of science; Benton in a 2001 article referred to the series as not just a documentary but also a "powerful piece of palaeobiological research", showing to the public what the "best minds in palaeobiology have been able to achieve." Numerous scientific journal articles have been written on Walking with Dinosaurs and the phenomenon it created.

Scientific errors 

Although the academic response to Walking with Dinosaurs was largely positive, the series was criticised by some palaeontologists for its speculative storylines and the boldness of some of its claims, noting that some aspects presented as fact were very much speculative and possible to be challenged in the future. In the companion book of the series, Haines admitted that speculating about dinosaur behaviour in of itself is unscientific since the theories cannot be tested, but maintained that it "seems well worth trying to find out more about how [the dinosaurs] may have lived", using both science and reasoned speculation. A handful of decisions and sequences in the series came under particular palaeontological criticism. Several supposed errors identified in the first weeks after the series aired fizzled out after a while, as critics found points about which they disagreed with one another and were unable to definitively prove their views. Most of the errors or otherwise questionable decisions of Walking with Dinosaurs were not the fault of the production team since they worked based on the advice of their consultants.

New Blood shows a male Postosuchus urinating to mark a female's territory as his own after she is driven away from it. A number of critics pointed out that birds and crocodiles, the closest living relatives of the dinosaurs, do not urinate; they shed waste chemicals as more solid uric acid. However, Michael J. Benton, a consultant of the series, noted that nobody could prove that this was a real mistake: copious urination is the primitive state for tetrapods (seen in fish, amphibians, turtles, and mammals), and perhaps basal archosaurs did the same.

Diplodocus was reconstructed with mostly horizontal necks in Walking with Dinosaurs, an idea consistent with what was thought of their biology at the time, and thus pushed by the palaeontological consultants of the series, but challenged by new research in 2009.

The pterosaur identified as Ornithocheirus in Giant of the Skies was actually based on fossils of the pterosaur Tropeognathus, the two having been considered synonyms by David Unwin, one of the consulting palaeontologists. Additionally, it is depicted as far larger than it actually was. In the companion book, it was claimed that several large bone fragments from the Romualdo Formation of Brazil possibly indicate that Ornithocheirus may have had a wingspan reaching almost 12 metres and a weight of a hundred kilograms, making it one of the largest known pterosaurs. However, the largest definite Tropeognathus specimens described at the time measured , in terms of wingspan. The specimens which the producers of the program used to justify such a large size estimate were described in 2012 (with the designation MN 6594-V) and were under study by Dave Martill and David Unwin at the time of the production of the series. Unwin stated that he did not believe the higher estimate used by the BBC was likely, and that the producers likely chose the highest possible estimate because it was more "spectacular." Another famously "super-sized" animal in Walking with Dinosaurs is the pliosaur Liopleurodon, described as reaching lengths of 25 metres in the series (but in reality probably only reaching 6.4 metres); the extreme size was based on fragmentary specimens, and the estimate was at the time justifiable extrapolation provided by some of the consultants, who pushed it as scientifically supported.

Television and popular culture 
Walking with Dinosaurs was recognised by several commentators as marking a watershed in television imagery and a scientifically and technologically significant benchmark in television history. Walking with Dinosaurs is often credited for inspiring modern interest in the distant geological past. Scientific papers have credited Jurassic Park and Walking with Dinosaurs as the two major productions inspiring increasing public interest in dinosaurs and other Mesozoic life in the 1990s and 2000s. The success of Walking with Dinosaurs led to the inception of an entirely new genre of documentaries that like Walking with Dinosaurs also recreated past life with computer graphics and were envisioned in the style of nature documentaries.

Sequel series 
The success of Walking with Dinosaurs led to the creation of an entire nature documentary media franchise on prehistoric life, commonly referred to as the Walking with... series. The first sequel series to Walking with Dinosaurs was Walking with Beasts (2001), made by largely the same production team (now organised as the production company Impossible Pictures) and focusing on life in the Cenozoic, after the extinction of the non-avian dinosaurs. Next was Walking with Cavemen (2003), which was created without Haines and Impossible Pictures and focused on human evolution. The last series to be made was Walking with Monsters (2005), once again involving much of the original team and focused on life in the Paleozoic, before the time of the dinosaurs. During the production of Walking with Monsters, the production team considered the series to complete the "Trilogy of Life", previously began with Dinosaurs and continued with Beasts.

The success of the two special episodes The Giant Claw and Land of Giants led to the creation of the three-part miniseries Sea Monsters (2003), once again starring Marven traveling back to prehistoric times, this time exploring the "seven deadliest seas of all time".

Notes

References

External links

 
 Walking with Dinosaurs at BBC Earth
 
 
 ABC's Walking With Dinosaurs site
 BBC Science & Nature – Prehistoric Life
 Walking with Dinosaurs – The Arena Spectacular official website

1999 British television series debuts
1999 British television series endings
1990s British documentary television series
Television series by BBC Studios
BBC television documentaries
Documentary television series about dinosaurs
Discovery Channel original programming
Peabody Award-winning television programs
Daytime Emmy Award for Outstanding Animated Program winners
BAFTA winners (television series)
Articles containing video clips
Primetime Emmy Award winners
Walking with...